Hsieh Su-wei and Peng Shuai were the defending champions, but lost in the second round to Anastasia Pavlyuchenkova and Lucie Šafářová.
Raquel Kops-Jones and Abigail Spears won the title, defeating Tímea Babos and Kristina Mladenovic in the final, 6–1, 2–0, ret.

Seeds
The top four seeds received a bye into the second round.

Draw

Finals

Top half

Bottom half

External links
 Main draw

Western and Southern Open Doubles
2013 Women's Doubles